The 2011 Sudirman Cup was the twelfth tournament of the Sudirman Cup. It was held from May 22–29, 2011 in Qingdao, China. According to the Badminton World Federation (BWF) 32 teams confirmed their participation, for the first time twelve teams competed in the elite group to battle for the title.

China defeated Denmark 3–0 in the final to win the Cup for the fourth consecutive time and eight time overall.

Host city selection
Two cities (one from Asia and one from Europe) declared interest to host the event. Qingdao later revealed as the sole bidder and the bid was approved by BWF during a council meeting in Kuala Lumpur.

Seedings
The seedings for teams competing in the tournament were released on March 9, 2011. It is based on aggregated points from the best players in the world ranking. The tournament will be divided into four groups, with twelve teams in the elite group competing for the title. Eight teams will be seeded into both the second and third groups, while only five teams will compete in the fourth group. The draw was held on April 17, 2011.

Group 1

Group 2

Group 3

Group 4

Group 1

Group stage

Group 1A

Group 1B

Group 1C

Group 1D

Knockout stage
The draw for the quarterfinals was held after the completion of the final matches in the group stage on May 25, 2011.

Bracket

Quarterfinals

Semifinals

Final

Group 2

Group 2A

Group 2B

Playoffs

Group 3

Group 3A

Group 3B

Playoffs

Group 4

Final standings

References

External links
Official website
2011 BWF Sudirman Cup at tournamentsoftware.com

2011
Sudirman Cup
Sudirman Cup
2011 Sudirman Cup
International sports competitions hosted by China
Sport in Qingdao